Ashley Maynard-Brewer (born 25 June 1999) is an Australian professional footballer who plays for Charlton Athletic.

Career

Charlton Athletic
Maynard-Brewer began his career in the academy at Australian club ECU Joondalup, before signing for Charlton Athletic in 2015, where he is contracted until the end of the 2022–23 season. On 13 November 2018, Maynard-Brewer made his debut for Charlton in a 1–0 EFL Trophy loss against Swansea City U21s.

Loans
Maynard-Brewer has been loaned out six times by Charlton.  He signed for Chelmsford City on loan in November 2018, and the following March joined Hampton & Richmond Borough on loan until the end of the 2018–19 season.

On 5 August 2019, Maynard-Brewer joined Dulwich Hamlet on a 28-day emergency loan, and the following January he joined Dover Athletic.

Maynard-Brewer joined Ross County on a season-long loan in August 2021.  Ahead of the 2022–23 season, Maynard-Brewer joined recently-relegated League Two club Gillingham on another season-long loan, Charlton holding the option to recall him. In July 2022 he suffered a dislocated shoulder in a pre-season friendly against his former side Dover Athletic, keeping him out of action for several months. He returned to action for Charlton's U21s side in a 2–0 loss to Bristol City's U21s on 1 November 2022. Maynard-Brewer was recalled from his loan on 17 November 2022 without making a competitive first-team appearance for Gillingham.

International career
Maynard-Brewer was part of the Olyroos Olympic squad at the Tokyo 2020 Olympics, but did not make an appearance.

Career statistics

References

1999 births
Living people
Australian soccer players
Australian expatriate sportspeople in England
Association football goalkeepers
Charlton Athletic F.C. players
Chelmsford City F.C. players
Hampton & Richmond Borough F.C. players
Dulwich Hamlet F.C. players
Dover Athletic F.C. players
Ross County F.C. players
Gillingham F.C. players
National League (English football) players
Scottish Professional Football League players
Footballers at the 2020 Summer Olympics
Olympic soccer players of Australia